Deutsche EuroShop AG is an internationally active German real estate investment company headquartered in Hamburg. It is the largest German investor in shopping centers, and the country's only publicly traded company to do so exclusively. At the end of 2021 the firm held investments in 21 properties in Germany, Austria, Poland, Czech Republic and Hungary.

The company's shares have been listed on the Frankfurt Stock Exchange since January 2001 and form part of the small-cap SDAX index.

History 
The company was founded on 10 October 1997 as a pure shelf company with the name TORWA Beteiligungs AG. The company's name was changed to Deutsche EuroShop on 21 August 2000. At that time, Deutsche Grundbesitz Management GmbH was the sole shareholder and provided the company with EUR 580 million as a capital reserve with no obligation in return, which Deutsche Grundbesitz Management GmbH, DI Deutsche Immobilien Treuhandgesellschaft and DB Immobilienfonds Kappa Dr. Rühl KG acquired the stakes in eight shopping centres. The management was operated in 2001 by ECE Projektmanagement GmbH & Co. KG.   

Deutsche EuroShop AG has been listed on the German stock exchange since 2 January 2001, and the entire proceeds from the issue went to Deutsche Grundbesitz Management GmbH (later name change to DB Real Estate), a subsidiary of Deutsche Bank. The chairmen of the board were Knut Neuss and Jürgen Wundrack, and the chairman of the supervisory board was Helmut Ullrich. On 15 April 2003 the company was included in the Prime Standard, and on 14 July 2003 in the SDAX. It was included in the EPRA index on 2 January 2004 and, from 20 September 2004, in the MDAX, which it had to leave on 23 September 2019. Since then, it has been on the SDAX again. There is also a listing in the North German regional index HASPAX. On 10 November 2005 the company received approx. EUR 67 million from a capital increase. Further capital increases followed on 7 July 2009 and on 1 February and 23 November 2010, which brought the company a total of 322 million euros. In November 2012, Deutsche EuroShop AG generated proceeds of around EUR 167.7 million from the placement of a convertible bond and shares from a capital increase. The convertible bond was finally converted to 99.5% in November 2017, the total number of shares was 61,783,594.          

Due to the COVID-19 pandemic, Deutsche EuroShop suffered loss of rent of 24.2% in the first half of 2020. The valuation of real estate assets was also devalued by an average of 5.5%.

Since 1 October 2022, Deutsche EuroShop AG is led by Hans-Peter Kneip as sole member of the Executive Board.

Shareholder structure 
The company's share capital is divided into 61,783,594 shares. 84.4 % are owned by Hercules BidCo GmbH, a consortium of the companies Oaktree Capital Management and CURA Vermögensverwaltung, the family office of the Otto family. The free float amounts to 15.6 %.

Corporate governance

Board 
The company is managed by Hans-Peter Kneip as CEO.

Supervisory board 
The supervisory board consists of nine members. The chairman is Reiner Strecker.

References

External links

Companies based in Hamburg